George Wade Robinson (10 September 1838 – 23 January 1876) was a poet and hymnist from Cork, Ireland.

Biography
Robinson was educated at Trinity College, Dublin, and New College, St. John's Wood, London. He entered the congregational ministry and was co-pastor at York Street Chapel in Dublin with William Urwick the elder. He then became pastor at St. John's Wood, Dudley, and at Union Chapel, Union Street, Brighton.  His best remembered poetry is in the hymn Loved with Everlasting Love with its chorus I am His and he His mine.

He died in Southampton on 23 January 1876.

Writings
Loveland and other poems 1871 ASIN: B0017UX9LO
Lays Of A Heart (1867) Kessinger Publishing Co (1 Oct 2008) 
The philosophy of the atonement & other sermons (Everyman's library, ed. by Ernest Rhys.    E.P. Dutton (1912) ASIN: B0008638BY
Iona, and other sonnets, etc ASIN: B0017UVJ48

References

External links
 Listen to Robinson hymns 
 Read Robinson's words  

Irish poets
1838 births
1877 deaths
19th-century poets